A sauna suit is a garment made from waterproof fabric designed to make the wearer sweat profusely. A sauna suit is sometimes called a "rubber suit" because the early types were made of rubber or rubberized cloth.  Now, sauna suits are typically made of PVC or coated nylon cloth.  The construction is typically in the style of a waterproof sweat suit, consisting of a pullover jacket and drawstring pants.  The closures at waist, neck, wrists and ankles are all elasticated to help retain body heat and moisture within the garment.  In some sauna suits, the jacket also includes a hood to provide additional retention of body heat.

Weight loss

Sauna suits have been used by wrestlers for the rapid loss of water weight by perspiration-induced dehydration. Several healthy collegiate-level wrestlers died from hyperthermia while undergoing such a regimen that included restricted diet and fluid intake.

The NCAA banned the use of sauna suits in 2013 ending what they called "a 10-year long dispute between sports sciences and coaches" after the wrestlers died. This proved to be the first of three deaths in a five-week period. In 2013, the NCAA said the ban ushered in an era where safe minimum weights, class qualification and nutrition are guided by science, which some enthusiasts say improved the participation and quality of the sport.

See also

Sportswear (activewear)

References

Sportswear
Body shape